Edward Annand (born 24 March 1973 in Glasgow) is a Scottish footballer who plays as a striker for Arthurlie.

Career

Early years
Annand began his career with Partick Thistle, where he played one game before moving to Sligo Rovers initially on loan. Prior to the 1993–94 season the move was made permanent. Annand scored the winning goal which sealed the 1993–94 League of Ireland First Division title and also the winner in the FAI Cup semi final. In the final he provided the corner kick which won the FAI Cup at Lansdowne Road in May 1994. This qualified Sligo for the 1994–95 UEFA Cup Winners' Cup where after beating Floriana F.C. Annand made two appearances against Club Brugge K.V.

At the end of that season he returned to Scotland to play with Clyde, where he enjoyed the best goalscoring form of his career, scoring 42 goals in 64 league matches. Dundee bought him in 1997 . He played in nearly 100 league appearances and picked up a Scottish First Division title during his time at Dens Park before moving to Ayr United in 2000. After three years with the Honest Men, including a short loan spell with Morton, Annand moved to St Mirren for a year's spell. In 2004, Annand moved to Dumbarton and part-time football, and spent the latter part of 2005 with Raith Rovers, where he finished his senior career. In January 2006, Annand moved into junior football with Lochee United but quickly moved to Bathgate Thistle. After a spell out of the game, Annand came out of retirement to join Arthurlie in November 2007.

Dundee
Annand joined Dundee in March 1997 for a fee of £75, 000.
	
Dundee manager John McCormack, who had taken over the Dens Park hotseat at Christmas, was keen to add some firepower to his side after losing Lee Power and Paul Tosh in January and brought in Annand just before the 31 March signing deadline in preparation for the following season. With promotion already gone, 'Cowboy' was building for next year and his new 5 ft 11in striker immediately started to pay dividends, with two goals in the last three games of the season.

With the support of new owners Peter and Jimmy Marr, McCormack brought in a number of new players in the summer with a view to getting promotion and amongst them was another striker James Grady from Clydebank, who would strike up a potent partnership with Annand. Between them Annand and Grady would score thirty-two goal to shoot Dundee into the inaugural SPL and on 15 April 1998, at Starks Park Kirkcaldy, Eddie scored the goal that gave Dundee the First Division title with the equaliser in a 1–1 draw with Raith.

In total Annand would score fourteen goals in his first full season with the club and these included a brace against Stirling and the winner in a 2–1 win away at Airdrie in the two games immediately before the title party at Raith.

In the summer Jocky Scott, who had taken over from McCormack in March, decided to bring in Tommy Coyne and Willie Falconer to challenge for the striking positions and it meant that Annand and Grady started together just three times in the S.P.L. It mattered not however as Dundee finished fifth, their highest league position for twenty-five years and Annand finished top goalscorer with ten strikes from his twenty-one starts and ten appearances from the bench.

On 22 November, Annand and Grady showed the fans that the old magic was still there, when they combined to score one of the most memorable goals in recent history. In a derby with United at Tanndice, Annand was in the starting line up with Grady starting on the bench and the turning point came when Eddie's old strike partner came on to replace Timmy Coyne. The game had been pretty much one way traffic towards the Dark Blue goal but with just eight minutes remaining, Grady ran onto an Eddie Annand head flick and scored a spectacular thirty yarder to give The Dee a famous win.

In the earlier derby at Dens in September, Annand himself came off the bench to be a goal scoring hero when he brought Dundee back into the match with a fine headed goal just after United had taken a two-goal lead. Annand's goal gave Dundee hope and in injury time, The Dee got themselves back on level terms when Adamzcuk charged in and headed powerfully into the net, despite the best efforts of Dykstra in the United goal and it felt like a victory in all but name.

Annand's goal was his second in consecutive home games and his first was equally as crucial as it gave Dundee a well deserved point against champions Celtic. In a torrid start to the season, Dundee had suffered four defeats with no goals scored but against Celtic on 29 September, the rot was stopped when Annand thundered a penalty home in the dying minutes to net Dundee's first goal of the season and earn their first point in the 1–1 draw.

By the end of the season, Dundee finished an excellent fifth and above Dundee United for the first time in a quarter of a century and Annand scored some memorable goals along the way. In October, he scored a brace at Pittodrie to earn a 2–2 draw at a venue then traditionally difficult for The Dee and in March got another brace in a 2–0 win over Hearts which included a clever twenty-five-yard lob over Rousett in the Hearts goal, after being played in by current manager Barry Smith.

In Annand's third season at Dens, he again had to fight for his place with Willie Falconer finding a rich vein of form and James Grady and later Paco Luna all fighting for a starting slot and at the end of the campaign he was amongst a number of players released when the new management team of Ivano and Dario Bonetti came in

Off the pitch, Annand helps to run a car hire firm, set up during his time at Bathgate.

Honours
Sligo Rovers
FAI Cup
 1993–94 
 League of Ireland First Division
 1993–94
 League of Ireland First Division Shield
Dundee 
 Scottish First Division
 1997–98

References

External links
 

1973 births
Arthurlie F.C. players
Ayr United F.C. players
Bathgate Thistle F.C. players
Clyde F.C. players
Dumbarton F.C. players
Dundee F.C. players
Greenock Morton F.C. players
League of Ireland players
Living people
Lochee United F.C. players
Partick Thistle F.C. players
Raith Rovers F.C. players
Scottish Football League players
Scottish footballers
Scottish Junior Football Association players
Scottish Premier League players
Sligo Rovers F.C. players
Footballers from Glasgow
St Mirren F.C. players
Association football forwards